The Recycler was first published in July, 1973, under the name E-Z Buy E-Z Sell by Canadians Gunter and Nancy Schaldach after they moved to Los Angeles. They modeled their paper after a similar publication in Vancouver.

The Recycler changed the economics model of private party classified ads: Instead of charging the advertisers to place ads, the Recycler ran the bulk of its classified ads for free, and charged buyers of the newspaper.

It started off as a bi-weekly mimeographed 16-page publication. The intention was to sell the paper for 25 cents, but most of the initial 15,000 copies were given away for free. "At the beginning it was kind of a chicken-egg thing," recalled John Dorman, who joined the operation in 1974. "People would buy it to get access to advertising, but there weren't very many ads. But we had to sell papers to get ads."

The name was changed to the Recycler to capitalize on the popularity of recycling in the early 1970s.

By 1975 the paper became profitable, and started being published weekly. The sale of display ads became an important source of revenue, and the company was able to hire its first full-time salesperson.

By the 1980s the Recycler was published in seven editions covering L.A., the San Fernando Valley, the South Bay, the San Gabriel Valley, Orange County, San Diego and the Inland Empire.

In 1988 the paper was sold from over 6,000 stores, and had a weekly readership of more than 540,000. By then, the company had more than 200 employees, plus another 120 who worked for McDuck Distribution, the distribution arm run by John Dorman. Single copies of the paper retailed for 55 cents to $1.25, depending on the edition. The Recycler brought in around $500,000 a week in circulation revenue, or $26 million a year, not including display ad sales.

A sister publication, Photo Buys Weekly, which featured ads accompanied by a photograph, was started in 1982.

The Recycler classified newspaper helped to launch the careers of many Los Angeles bands including Dead Kennedys, The Bangles, Guns N' Roses, Metallica, Mötley Crüe, and Hole. The company was sold by the Los Angeles Times to Target Media Partners in 2007 is now located in North Hollywood, California. The Recycler was relaunched in 2010 as a website.

Influence on music 
James Hetfield responded to an advertisement in the magazine written by Lars Ulrich, founding Metallica.
Mick Mars entered Mötley Crüe after Nikki Sixx responded to an advertisement Mick placed in the magazine that read, "Loud, rude, and aggressive guitarist available."
Slash answered an ad in The Recycler to join Guns N' Roses from Izzy Stradlin. Eric Erlandson responded to an advertisement created by Hole frontwoman Courtney Love in 1989: "I want to start a band. My influences are Big Black, Sonic Youth, and Fleetwood Mac."

References

External links
 

Defunct newspapers published in California